Rimava is a river in southern central Slovakia, which flows only in the Rimavská Sobota District. It is a right tributary of the Slaná river.

Its source is in Veporské vrchy at approximately 1,130 m above sea level. It flows through these towns: Tisovec, Hnúšťa and Rimavská Sobota. It pours to the Slaná river near Vlkyňa at 145 m a.s.l.

References

Rivers of Slovakia